"Next Is the E" (alternately known as "I Feel It") is a song by American electronica musician Moby, released in October 1992 as the third single from his self-titled debut album (1992).

Release 
"Next Is the E" was released on October 28, 1992. The single peaked at number eight on the US Billboard Hot Dance Music/Club Play chart. It was featured on the soundtrack of the 1992 film Cool World.

In the United Kingdom, the track was renamed "I Feel It", due to Moby's record company's concerns over what appeared to be a reference to the drug ecstasy in the original title. Released as a double A-side single with "Thousand", it peaked at number 33 on the UK Singles Chart.

Critical reception 
In his weekly UK chart commentary, James Masterton wrote, "His first chart outing since ["Go"] is this, another semi-instrumental dance hit although in a rather more high powered vein. Maybe not a massive smash but worth seeing it in the charts if only to hope that he makes a return to Top of the Pops." Andy Beevers from Music Week gave "I Feel It" four out of five, adding, "A popular import from last year, this tough but melodic techno/house single finally gets a UK release courtesy of the new Pinnacle-owned Equator label. The inclusion of a new mix by Moby himself on the follow-up 12-inch should help sales, although do not expect a "Go"-style crossover." Charles Aaron from Spin said, "Took a while to get me down the aisle, but Moby's best-yet techno hymn insistently testifies with skipping keyboards and Nicole Zaray's breathy invocation."

Track listing

Charts

References

External links 
 
 

Moby songs
1992 singles
Songs written by Moby
1992 songs
Instinct Records singles